Francisco Jesús Martín Milán is a Spanish historian, writer and teacher. In 2011 he got a bachelor's degree in Humanities for Universidad de Almería.

In 2012 he published La población de Berja en el siglo XX. The presentation of the book was assisted with more than one hundred people. In 2016 he published Madre anoche en las trincheras, about the history of the two brothers Corral Martínez in Serón during the Spanish Civil War.

In 2018 he became a candidate of the Final Nacional de Acción Magistral 2018 for his coordination of the "VII ENCUENTRO DE TESTIMONIOS: Los niños de la guerra de España". In 2019 he worked with Sonia Cervantes and they published La guerra en mis ojos. Los cuatro exilios de Ana, about Ana Pomares, who survived to la Desbandá.

Works
 La población de Berja en el siglo XX
 Madre anoche en las trincheras
 Berja. Segunda República, Guerra Civil y Represión franquista (1931–1936)
 La guerra en mis ojos. Los cuatro exilios de Ana (2019)

References

External links
 

People from Almería
21st-century Spanish historians
Writers from Andalusia
Spanish male writers
21st-century Spanish male writers
21st-century Spanish educators
Living people
Year of birth missing (living people)